Walton County Courthouse may refer to:

 Walton County Courthouse (Florida), DeFuniak Springs, Florida
 Walton County Courthouse (Georgia), Monroe, Georgia